Sovetabad may refer to:
 Sovetabad, Babek, Azerbaijan
 Sovetabad, Sharur, Azerbaijan
Həsənabad, Azerbaijan
Şuraabad, Khizi, Azerbaijan